Kim Hoon is a South Korean novelist, journalist and critic.

Life
Kim was born on May 5, 1948, in Seoul, Korea. After graduating from Whimoon High School, Kim Hoon entered Korea University in 1966. He joined Hankook Ilbo as a journalist in 1973.
He made his debut as a novelist at the age of forty-seven with the publication of Memories of Earthenware with Comb Teeth Pattern. His second novel. Song of the Sword, which was awarded the prestigious Dong-in Literature Prize, was a literary sensation and elevated him into one of the most recognized names in Korean literature. Two years later in 2003, Kim's reputation as a writer of exceptional talent was affirmed when his first published short-story “Cremation” was chosen as the winner of Lee Sang Literature Prize. Kim worked as a journalist for 20 years before becoming a writer and is well known for refusing to use anything but a pencil when he writes. He is also an avid bicyclist who does not have a driver's license and has written a series of essays on his bicycle travels across the south of the Korean peninsula.

Works
Though he became a fiction writer at a relatively late age, Kim writes with flair and the dexterity of a seasoned novelist. Grounded in his journalistic background, his writing style is polished and unsentimental, and Kim crafts his sentences masterfully to infuse lyrical rhythm to his work without sacrificing clarity and poise. His job as a journalist, which required him to rush to the scenes of disaster, has also given him an insight into the psychology of people in extreme circumstances. Kim's ability to discern pertinent details and moments of significance in the chaos of life-or-death situations, which he perfected in his line of work as a reporter, can be observed in his first novel, Memories of Earthenware with Comb Teeth Pattern. Written in form of a detective story involving a mysterious death of a firefighter, the novel presents a palpably real portrait of the battle with raging fire, and investigates the intensity of human emotions in dire circumstances with acuity, subtlety and insight. In his second novel Song of the Sword, Kim gives us a powerful picture of General Yi Sun-sin, not as a mere war-hero, but as an ordinary man facing extraordinary circumstances and struggling with complexity of his own interior landscape. His most recent novel Song of Strings focuses on the life of the renowned musician Ureug who lived more than fifteen hundred years ago during the Shilla period.

Namhansanseong is his latest work, and has sold almost 1 million copies in South Korea. It is based on the incident of Byeongjahoran, in which during the Second Manchu invasion of Korea in 1636, when King Injo of Joseon Dynasty took refuge in the Namhan Mountain Fortress in Gyeonggi-do, in an ill-fated attempt to defy the rule of the Manchu Qing Empire Hong Taiji, following the First Manchu invasion of Korea in 1627. It was adapted into a film, entitled The Fortress, in 2017.

In 2009 a musical also titled, Namhansanseong was based on the novel, but focuses on the lives of common people and their spirit of survival during harsh situations. It stars Yesung of boy band Super Junior as villain "Jung Myung-soo", a servant-turned-interpreter. It was shown from 14 to 31 October at Seongnam Arts Center Opera House.

In 2011 Kim's work “Schwertgesang” (translated by Heidi Kang and Ahn So-hyun) won the Daesan Award for Translated Literature.

Translated works
Language; German 
Title: Schwertgesang 
Original title: 칼의 노래 
Genre: Modern/ Fiction 
Publisher: Edition Delta 
Translated by: Heidi Kang  
	
Language: French 
Title: Le Chant Du Sabre 
Original title: 칼의 노래 
Genre: Modern/ Fiction 
Publisher: Gallimard 
Translated by : Yang Young-Nan  , François Théron

Language: English 
Title: From Powder to Powder 
Genre: Modern/ Fiction 
In: Land of Exile

Awards
Dong-in Prize 2001, for his novel, Song of the Sword
Saturation coverage prize from 18th Seoul Journalist Club Award, 2002
2004 Yi Sang Literary Award, 〈화장〉 "Cremation" (Called "From Powder to Powder" in translation)
The 4th Hwang Sunwon Prize, 2005, for The menopause of my older sister 
The 15th Daesan Literary Award, 2007
Daesan Award for Translated literature, 2011 for "Schwertgesang"

See also
Korean literature

References

External links
 An interview with Kim Hoon from OhMyNews
 An interview with Kim Hoon from Hankook Ilbo

1948 births
Living people
South Korean novelists
Whimoon High School alumni
Korea University alumni